Ragi Edde (born May 18, 1985) is a Lebanese former swimmer, who specialized in sprint freestyle events. Edde competed for Lebanon in the men's 100 m freestyle, as a 15-year-old, at the 2000 Summer Olympics in Sydney. He received a Universality place from FINA, in an entry time of 55.00. He challenged six other swimmers in heat two, including fellow 15-year-old Dawood Youssef of Bahrain. He edged out Congo's Marien Michel Ngouabi to overhaul a minute barrier and pick up a fifth seed by 1.13 seconds in 59.26. Edde failed to advance into the semifinals, as he placed sixty-eighth overall in the prelims.

References

1985 births
Living people
Lebanese male freestyle swimmers
Olympic swimmers of Lebanon
Swimmers at the 2000 Summer Olympics